La Calotterie is a commune in the Pas-de-Calais department in the Hauts-de-France region of France.

Geography
A small village situated some 2 miles (3 km) northwest of Montreuil-sur-Mer at the D146 and D149 crossroads.

Population

Visemarest and Quentovic
Close to the village of La Calotterie is the hamlet of Visemarest. Excavations coordinated by Dr David Hill of Manchester University between 1984 and 1991 uncovered the remains of a substantial early-medieval settlement there. This is now accepted as the site of the port and trading settlement of Quentovic or 'Quentovicus', although the finds from the excavations are located in the Musée de Quentovic in Étaples (the museum predating the discovery of the site itself by a number of years).

Places of interest
 The church of St. Firmin, dating from the eighteenth century.
 Three Chateaux nearby.

See also
Communes of the Pas-de-Calais department

References

 Hill, D. et al. (1990). 'Quentovic defined', Antiquity, 64, no. 242.

Calotterie